Demetrio Alessandro Greco (born 10 August 1979, in Cosenza) is an Italian footballer. He plays for Montalto in the Italian Eccellenza.

Career
He was signed by Messina of Serie B on 29 January 2004.

External links
 
 Alessandro Demetrio Greco - scheda calciatore

Living people
1979 births
Italian footballers
Sportspeople from Cosenza
Association football goalkeepers
A.C.R. Messina players
FC Aarau players
Swiss Super League players
FC Luzern players
SC Young Fellows Juventus players
L'Aquila Calcio 1927 players
U.S. Castrovillari Calcio players
Footballers from Calabria